Tate City is an unincorporated community and census-designated place in Towns County, Georgia, United States.  It was founded as a mining and logging community. The community was named after one Mr. Tate, a businessperson in the local lumber industry.

Tate City sits in a scenic valley along the upper Tallulah River, just south of the Georgia-North Carolina border. The community is flanked by various peaks of the Blue Ridge and Nantahala Mountains, including 4568-foot Hightower Bald, 4640-ft. Dicks Knob, and 5499-ft. Standing Indian Mountain.

Demographics
As of the 2010 United States Census, there were 16 people living in the CDP. The racial makeup of the CDP was 100.0% White.

References

Unincorporated communities in Towns County, Georgia
Unincorporated communities in Georgia (U.S. state)